is a Japanese voice actor represented with T's Factory. He is from Tokyo. He graduated from the Amusement Media Academy, in which he was classmates with Takashi Kondō and Go Inoue. On 7 July 2017, he married voice actress Ayumi Tsuji.

Appearances
Bold denotes the main character.

TV anime
Kaleido Star (Chris, Vince, reporter, animal cast member, couple man, Dick, cast member, man, operator)
Kaleido Star: New Wings (Charlie, Vince, reporter, assistant director)
Kimi ga Aruji de Shitsuji ga Ore de (Unbeliever (3))
Soreike! Zukkoke  (Fumi Minamoto)
Paboo & Mojies (Peter Pig)
Play Ball (Igarashi)
Lemon Angel Project (Hajime Saginomiya)
Yofukashi no Uta (Matsuda)

Video games
Darling II Backlash (Kazuhiro Iwato)
Signal (Kazuhiro Iwato)
Project Sylpheed (Brandon Shore)

Radio
Radio de Anime Tamashī
Radio BS11 (voice of BS11's official character Juuitchan)

Stage
Engeki Shūdan Chicken Run 3rd performance (dual lead/Altair Collins)

References

External links
 

Japanese male voice actors
People from Tokyo
1980 births
Living people